Michael John Christopher Scott (8 December 1932 – 30 May 2008) was a British television producer and presenter. He is best remembered for his TV talk show, The Time, The Place and his work as a reporter on World in Action.

Scott was born in London and educated at the Latymer School, Edmonton, London, and Clayesmore School in Dorset. He served as a second lieutenant in the Royal Army Ordnance Corps during his national service. After leaving the Army, Scott worked as a salesman for Unilever before becoming a stage hand at the Royal Festival Hall. Scott gained an Equity card and went on to appear as an extra in films such as Above Us the Waves and The Quatermass Xperiment.

In 1955, Scott joined the Rank Organisation as a trainee cameraman before moving to Granada Television as a floor manager in 1956. He eventually became a programme director and then a producer and presenter at Granada. Scott was programme controller at Granada from 1979 until 1987. From 1987 to 1993 Scott presented The Time, The Place .

References
 Obituary: Independent

External links
 
 Obituary: Guardian
 Obituary: Times

1932 births
2008 deaths
Television people from London
English television presenters
English television producers
Royal Army Ordnance Corps officers
Unilever people
People educated at Clayesmore School
People educated at The Latymer School